The 2022–23 season is the 112th season in the existence of GNK Dinamo Zagreb and the club's 32nd consecutive season in the top flight of Croatian football. In addition to the domestic league, Dinamo Zagreb is participating in this season's editions of the Croatian Cup and the UEFA Champions League.

Players

First-team squad
 

 

 

 after match against  NK Osijek

Transfers

In

Loan returnees

Out

Loan out

Pre-season and friendlies

Competitions

Overall record

Croatian Football Super Cup

Hrvatska nogometna liga

League table

Results summary

Results by round

Croatian Football Cup

UEFA Champions League

Second qualifying round

Third qualifying round

Play off round

Group stage

The draw for the group stage was held on 25 August 2022.

References

GNK Dinamo Zagreb seasons
Dinamo Zagreb
2022–23 UEFA Champions League participants seasons
2022–23 UEFA Europa League participants seasons